The PSR-90 (Precision Sniper Rifle) is a Pakistani semi-automatic 7.62×51mm precision rifle designed and manufactured by Pakistan Ordnance Factories. It is used by the SSG commandos.

Characteristics
The PSR-90 Sniper rifle is considered a variant of the H&K PSG1. In the words of the manufacturer it has the accuracy of a sniper rifle and the firepower of a machine gun. It has a weight of 8.1 kg with an overall length of 1158 mm. It has a Polygonaly rifled barrel having length of 600 mm with a fully adjustable stock, the barrel is a four grooves right hand twisted barrel. It is semi-automatic and Roller delayed blowback operated. It operates a 7.62×51mm cartridge yet can operate .308 rounds. It fires bullets with a muzzle velocity of 870 m/s with an effective range of 1000 m, the bullets being fed from a 5 or 20 rounds Magazine. It has an accuracy of 90 mm group at a distance of 300 m. A trigger pull of 1.6 kg can be added optionally. The sniper rifle is generally operated with a 5.5-22×50 NXS sight but a 6×42 telescopic sight can be used instead. A Silencer Telescopic sight and carrying sling can be added or removed optionally.

Operators
: Pakistan Army
: Vietnam People's Army and Vietnam People's Public Security

See also

Comparable Sniper rifles
Pindad SPR
Komodo Armament D7CH
Istiglal anti-materiel rifle
Yalguzag sniper rifle
MKEK JNG-90
T-12 sniper rifle
Kalekalıp KNT-308
Siyavash sniper rifle
Arash (sniper rifle)
Tabuk Sniper Rifle

Other POF products
POF Eye
HMG PK-16
LSR
Azb sniper rifle

References

External links
1

7.62×51mm NATO semi-automatic rifles
Designated marksman rifles
Pakistani inventions
Roller-delayed blowback firearms
Sniper rifles of Pakistan
Recoil-operated firearms